TV1 (TV vienas) is a TV channel in Lithuania, launched in 2003. It is a sister channel of LNK television.
In 2018 TV1 logo has been changed and placed up left corner on the screen. April 29, 2003 – 2005 TV1 broadcast only in Vilnius, Klaipėda and the surroundings of these cities. Since 2005 began to be broadcast in Kaunas.

Series 
 Слепая (Russian series, Drama)
 Canim Annem (Turkish series, Drama)
 Kaderimin Oyunu (Turkish series, Drama)
 Kirmizi Oda (Turkish series, Drama)
 Dogdugun Ev Kaderindir (Turkish series, Drama)
 Die Bergretter (German, Austrian series, Drama)
 Die Rosenheim-Cops (German series, Comedy, Drama, Detective)
 Helt (German series, Comedy, Drama, Detective)
 Tote am See (German series, Detective)
 Blind ermittelt (German series, Detective)
 Un passo dal cielo (Italian series, Comedy, Detective)
 Don Matteo (Italian series, Comedy Detective)
 Candise Renoir (French series, Comedy, Detective)
 Crimes Parfaits (French series, Detective)
 Pollen et des Beaumont (French series, Detective, Comedy)
 Morden I Sandhamn (Swedish series, Detective)
 Svarta sandar (Scandinavian series, Detective)
 Monikai Reikia Meilės (Lithuanian series, Love, Drama)

Reality shows 
 Od dziewczyn do pań (Polish)

Documentary 
 Gynybinis paveldas Lietuvoje. Kauno tvirtovė (Lithuanian)
 Pasirinkę Lietuva (Lithuanian)
 Praeities kartų liudytojai (Lithuanian)
 Istorija gyvai (Lithuanian)

Shows 
Sveikinimai (Lithuanian) Vedėja Laima Kybartienė

See also 
 List of Lithuanian television channels

References

External links 
TV1

Television channels in Lithuania
2003 establishments in Lithuania